Sepe is an Italian surname. Notable people with the surname include:

Angelo Sepe, (1941–1984) Italian-American gangster
Crescenzio Sepe, Italian cardinal
Daniele Sepe, Italian musician
Frank Sepe, American fitness author
Luigi Sepe, Italian footballer
Majda Sepe, (1937–2006) Slovenian singer
Michele Sepe, Italian rugby player
Mimmo Sepe (died 2020), Italian comedian

Italian-language surnames